Ferney-Voltaire is a commune in the Ain department in the Auvergne-Rhône-Alpes region of eastern France. It lies between the Jura Mountains and the Swiss border; it forms part of the metropolitan area of Geneva.

History
Ferney was first noted in 14th-century Burgundian registers as "Fernex" and changed several times until the 19th century to Fernay, Fernaj, Fernai or Fernex before adopting its current name as 'Ferney-Voltaire' in 1791, after the French Revolution which saw a number of city names unchristened and then given more republican names.

During Voltaire's residence in Ferney in the second part of the 18th century, the town saw rapid expansion. Today Ferney is a peaceful town with a Saturday market and a large international community, due to the proximity of CERN and the United Nations Office at Geneva. Ferney is growing very quickly. It is also home to the Lycée International. Voltaire still presides over Ferney with his statue in the centre of town.

Voltaire

From 1759 to 1778 Ferney was home to French writer and philosopher Voltaire, sometimes referred to as "the patriarch of Ferney." His influence on the town was profound. He built the local church and founded cottage industries that produced some of the finest potters and watchmakers of modern France. The town was eventually renamed "Ferney-Voltaire" in his honour.

In 1759, after having lived in Geneva for less than two years, Voltaire purchased the estate of Ferney in France, near the Swiss border. A prime reason for his leaving Geneva was that theatre was forbidden in that Calvinist city, so he had decided to become the enlightened "patriarch" of the little village of Ferney, setting up potteries, a watchmaking industry and, of course, theatres, attracting rich people from Geneva to watch his plays.

During Voltaire's residence, the population of Ferney increased to more than 1,000. Voltaire lived there for the last 20 years of his life before returning to Paris, where he died in 1778.

Population

Schools

The community has two public preschools/primary schools: École Jean-Calas and École Florian. A nearby intercommunal school, École Intercommunale Jean de la Fontaine in Prévessin-Moëns, also serves the community.  the three schools had a combined total of 952 students, with Jean-Calas, Florian, and Jean de la Fontaine respectively having 278, 307, and 367 students. Around 1940 a primary school, the École de Ferney-Voltaire, was established. About 1970 it was renamed École Florian, after the French poet and fabulist Jean-Pierre Claris de Florian, whose uncle and guardian, the Marquis de Florian, had married a niece of Voltaire, . The school is notable for having had a large number of pupils who were children of physicists at CERN, which is located in the vicinity. Ferney-Voltaire also has a private preschool/primary school, École Saint-Vincent.

Collège Le Joran (junior high school), in Prévessin-Moëns, serves Ferney-Voltaire. Lycée international de Ferney-Voltaire, including a junior high school/middle school (collège) and a senior high school/sixth form college (lycée) was created in 1961 in Ferney-Voltaire. As of 2016, the Lycée includes a branch campus in Saint-Genis-Pouilly.

Sights

Ferney's main attraction is Voltaire's house (château), built 1758–66, now owned and administered by the Centre des monuments nationaux (an arm of the French Ministry of Culture). The chateau includes the main building, with a reconstruction of Voltaire's room (moved from its original location by later private owners), a garden with a fine view of the Alps, and a church dedicated, contrary to custom, directly to God.  In the church's inscription, "Deo erexit VOLTAIRE" ("Erected to God by VOLTAIRE"), Voltaire's name is written in the largest characters.

A few dozen metres from the chateau is another impressive house, built in 1900 by Monsieur Lambert (the sculptor of the statue of Voltaire; his family owned the chateau before it was purchased by the French government). The house, now privately owned, had been used to store provisions and wine for the chateau, and to accommodate the household staff.

The village features 18th-century houses and artisans' workshops; a life-size statue of Voltaire; a smaller bust of him, surmounting a fountain; many restaurants, French and foreign; and proximity to the nearby cosmopolitan city of Geneva, Switzerland.

Every Saturday, a market is held in the main street of Ferney.

The old road at the centre of the village is a remnant of the time when Voltaire resided at the chateau in Ferney-Voltaire.

The pedestal of the Voltaire statue, erected in 1890, dedicates that memorial to the town's "benefactor", noting that he built over a hundred houses for the inhabitants, as well as a school and church, gave the town interest-free loans, and fed its inhabitants in time of need.

On 31 May 2018, Président Emmanuel Macron officially visited the Château for the re-opening after renovation.

Personalities
 Harrikrisna Anenden (b. 1947), film director
 Hina Aoyama (b. 1970), paper-cutting artist and illustrator
 Saphia Azzeddine (b. 1979), writer, actress and screenwriter
 Marie Louise Denis (1712-1790), a niece of Voltaire
 Ananda Devi (b. 1957), writer
 Andy Johnson-Laird (b. 1945), computer scientist
 Jean-Antoine Lépine (1720-1814), watchmaker
 Gaspard Mermillod (1824-1892), bishop, later cardinal
 Michel Meylan (1939-2020), politician
 Gilles Mirallès (1966-2022), chess player
 Antoine Porcel (1937-2014), boxer
 David Pujadas (b.1964), journalist and television host 
 Brian Savegar (1932-2007), production designer
 Georges Vianès, mayor of Ferney-Voltaire from 1995 to 2001
 Jean-Louis Wagnière (1739-1802), Voltaire's secretary for over twenty years, later mayor of Ferney-Voltaire
 Nedd Willard (1926-2018), writer, artist and journalist

See also
 List of places named after people
Communes of the Ain department

References

External links

 Ferney-Voltaire commune 
 Pays de Gex Tourism  
 
 Official website of Voltaire’s chateau

Communes of Ain
Ain communes articles needing translation from French Wikipedia